Limbiate is a comune (municipality) in the Province of Monza and Brianza in the Italian region Lombardy, located about  north of Milan.
As of 2016, it had a population of 35.279.

Limbiate integrates the fraction of Mombello where the neuropsychiatric hospital was located.

References

External links
 Official website